Greenfield (formerly, Delkern) is a census-designated place in Kern County, California. The population was 3,991 at the 2010 census.

The Delkern post office was opened in 1949. That name derives from Kern Delta, a designation for the surrounding area.

Demographics
At the 2010 census Greenfield had a population of 3,991. The racial makeup of Greenfield was 2,512 (62.9%) White, 71 (1.8%) African American, 63 (1.6%) Native American, 45 (1.1%) Asian, 1 (0.0%) Pacific Islander, 1,112 (27.9%) from other races, and 187 (4.7%) from two or more races. Hispanic or Latino of any race were 2,263 persons (56.7%).

The whole population lived in households, no one lived in non-institutionalized group quarters and no one was institutionalized.

There were 1,244 households, 522 (42.0%) had children under the age of 18 living in them, 709 (57.0%) were opposite-sex married couples living together, 149 (12.0%) had a female householder with no husband present, 106 (8.5%) had a male householder with no wife present.  There were 74 (5.9%) unmarried opposite-sex partnerships, and 6 (0.5%) same-sex married couples or partnerships. 225 households (18.1%) were one person and 97 (7.8%) had someone living alone who was 65 or older. The average household size was 3.21.  There were 964 families (77.5% of households); the average family size was 3.63.

The age distribution was 1,126 people (28.2%) under the age of 18, 428 people (10.7%) aged 18 to 24, 928 people (23.3%) aged 25 to 44, 1,125 people (28.2%) aged 45 to 64, and 384 people (9.6%) who were 65 or older.  The median age was 34.4 years. For every 100 females, there were 106.3 males.  For every 100 females age 18 and over, there were 105.4 males.

There were 1,358 housing units at an average density of 912.4 per square mile, of the occupied units 870 (69.9%) were owner-occupied and 374 (30.1%) were rented. The homeowner vacancy rate was 3.0%; the rental vacancy rate was 8.5%.  2,660 people (66.6% of the population) lived in owner-occupied housing units and 1,331 people (33.4%) lived in rental housing units.

References

Census-designated places in Kern County, California
Census-designated places in California